Genko Slavov (born 4 January 1981 in Varna) is a Bulgarian footballer. He currently plays as a goalkeeper.

Career
Born in Varna, Slavov started his career as a 10-year-old at his hometown club, Spartak Varna. He was promoted from their youth team in June 2000. After two seasons as a third-choice keeper, behind Krasimir Kolev and Georgi Arnaudov, he made his debut during the 2002–03 season on 12 April 2003 in a 0–3 home loss against Slavia Sofia, coming on as a substitute for Kolev. Since his debut, Slavov has established himself as Spartak's first-choice goalkeeper.

In June 2003 Genko was snatched up by Bulgarian giants CSKA Sofia for a fee of a reported €50,000. In Sofia he was the fourth-choice keeper and earned just one appearance. Slavov's only league appearance of that season came in a 0–3 away loss against Cherno More Varna on 8 May 2004. Following Slavov's release from CSKA he returned to Spartak Varna after signing a three-year contract in June 2004.

Statistics
As of 10 January 2011.

References

1981 births
Living people
PFC Spartak Varna players
PFC CSKA Sofia players
PFC Kaliakra Kavarna players
FC Chernomorets Balchik players
Bulgarian footballers
First Professional Football League (Bulgaria) players

Association football goalkeepers
Sportspeople from Varna, Bulgaria